Thomas Hucker (born 1955) is an American artist working in furniture.

Early years
Hucker was born in Bryn Mawr, Pennsylvania. He apprenticed for two years under Leonord Hilgner. He attended four summer study sessions at the Penland School of Crafts studying under the likes of Sam Maloof. From 1976 until 1980 he earned a Certificate of Mastery from Boston University Program in Artisanry followed by time at Tokyo University and a degree from Domus Academy in Milan, Italy.

Style
Hucker has from early on incorporated Japanese aesthetics and has cited an early meeting with Isamu Noguchi in the late Seventies as heavily influential. His influences also include classical music, jazz musicians including Leonard Hilgner.

Exhibitions

Cooper Hewitt Museum
Museum of Fine Arts, Boston

Awards and recognition
American Craft Council College of Fellows
Fellowship from the National Endowment for the Arts (1983)
Fulbright Scholarship for Tokyo University (2018)

In popular culture
 In the Parks and Recreation episode "Moving Up," Hucker is referenced by Ron Swanson, whose character is also a wood-working artisan.

References

American furniture designers
Boston University alumni
People from Bryn Mawr, Pennsylvania
Living people
1955 births